Wirscheid is an Ortsgemeinde – a community belonging to a Verbandsgemeinde – in the Westerwaldkreis in Rhineland-Palatinate, Germany.

Geography

The community lies in the Westerwald between Koblenz and Altenkirchen in the Kannenbäckerland (“Jug Bakers’ Land”, a small region known for its ceramics industry). Wirscheid belongs to the Verbandsgemeinde of Ransbach-Baumbach, a kind of collective municipality. Its seat is in the like-named town.

History
In 1547, Wirscheid had its first mention in a historical document as Wersched.

Politics

The municipal council is made up of 11 council members, including the extraofficial mayor (Bürgermeister), who were elected in a municipal election on 13 June 2004.

Economy and infrastructure

Autobahn A 48 with its Höhr-Grenzhausen interchange (AS 12) lies 6 km away. The nearest InterCityExpress stop is the railway station at Montabaur on the Cologne-Frankfurt high-speed rail line.

References

External links
Wirscheid 

Municipalities in Rhineland-Palatinate
Westerwaldkreis